Ngasepam Tondonba Singh (born 14 November 1994), is an Indian professional footballer who plays as a defender for Indian Super League club NorthEast United.

Career
Born in Manipur, to a Hindu Meitei family. Singh began his career with local side NEROCA at the age of 11. He soon then rose through the ranks at the club and made his senior debut in the Manipur State League at the age of 16. He continued to play for the club in the I-League 2nd Division and was part of the side that earned promotion to the I-League, one of India's top leagues.

Singh made his professional debut for the club in the I-League on 1 December 2017 in their opening match against Minerva Punjab. He started and played the full match as NEROCA lost 2–1. He would go on to play in every match for NEROCA as they finished in second place during their debut top flight season.

Chennaiyin
At the conclusion of the 2017–18 season, Singh signed a pre-contract agreement with Chennaiyin of the Indian Super League. In the 2019-20 season, he became the starting left back for Chennayin, winning the spot from Jerry Lalrinzuala.

NorthEast United
On 7 September 2021, NorthEast United confirmed the signing of Tondonba Singh on its social media and various other platforms for the 2021-22 season.

Career statistics

Club

References

1994 births
Living people
Indian footballers
NEROCA FC players
Chennaiyin FC players
Mumbai City FC players
NorthEast United FC players
Association football defenders
Footballers from Manipur
I-League 2nd Division players
I-League players
Indian Super League players